Rubén Leibovich (born 25 April 1934) is an Argentine former wrestler. He competed in two events at the 1964 Summer Olympics.

References

External links
 

1934 births
Living people
Argentine male sport wrestlers
Olympic wrestlers of Argentina
Wrestlers at the 1964 Summer Olympics
Place of birth missing (living people)
20th-century Argentine people
21st-century Argentine people